Xima Township is a township under the administration of Hongjiang, Hunan, China. , it has 11 villages under its administration.

References 

Townships of Huaihua
Hongjiang